The 2009 FIBA Africa Under-16 Championship for Women (alternatively the Afrobasket U16) was the 1st U-16 FIBA Africa championship for women, played under the auspices of the Fédération Internationale de Basketball, the basketball sport governing body and qualified for the 2010 World Cup. The tournament was held from August 30–September 5 in Bamako, Mali, contested by 8 national teams and won by Mali.

The tournament qualified the winner for the 2010 U17 World Women's Championship.

Teams

Squads

Format
 The five teams who participated played in a single round-robin preliminary round. 
 After the preliminaries, only the top two teams qualified for the gold medal match to determine the African Champions and represent the FIBA Africa at the 2010 FIBA Basketball Under-17 Women's World Cup.

Preliminary round
Times given below are in UTC.

Gold medal game

Final standings

Awards

All-Tournament Team

 G  Artemis Afonso
 G  Reem Moussa
 F  N'Dèye N'Diaye
 F  Hagar Amer
 C  Farima Touré

Statistical Leaders

Individual Tournament Highs

Points

Rebounds

Assists

Steals

Blocks

Minutes

Individual Game Highs

Team Tournament Highs

Points per Game

Total Points

Rebounds

Assists

Steals

Blocks

2-point field goal percentage

3-point field goal percentage

Free throw percentage

Team Game highs

See also
 2009 FIBA Africa Championship for Women

External links
Official Website

References

2009 FIBA Africa Under-16 Championship for Women
2009 FIBA Africa Under-16 Championship for Women
2009 FIBA Africa Under-16 Championship for Women
International women's basketball competitions hosted by Mali
2009 in youth sport
2009 in women's basketball